Tabwakea, also known as Tabakea, is a village in Kiribati, located on the island of Kiritimati, within the archipelago of Line Islands. In 2020, it was inhabited by 3,537 people, making it the most populated of the four settlements of the island.

Name 
Tabwakea means turtle in Gilbertese language and may refer to the first name given by James Cook on 24 December 1777, Turtle Island, before giving to it the name of Christmas Island (Kiritimati).

Demographics 
In 2005 it had a population of 1,881 people. In 2010 it had a population of 2,311, 3,001 in 2015, and 3,537 in 2020. It is the largest village on Kiritimati and in the whole Line Islands.

Geography 
Tabwakea is around 224km north of the equator. The only road connects Banana to the east.

References

Populated places in Kiribati
Kiritimati